
Rat-children, chuas. or mice are children or adults suffering from microcephaly, exploited as beggars situated in Gujrat City, particularly the Shrine of Saint Shah Dolah, and elsewhere in Pakistan. They have sloping foreheads, narrow faces that resemble rodents, and are often intellectually disabled and dependent on others.

Begging rings and gangs allegedly place iron bands around the heads of healthy children to induce cranial deformation. The Shrine of Shah Dolah, home to many of the rat children, is a common pilgrimage site for women and married couples who wish to bear children. Ignoring a rat child's plea for money is thought to bring bad luck.

References

Further reading

Works cited

General references

External links
 Two portraits (a documentary about Rats of Doleh shah)

Child abuse
Demographics of Pakistan